Walter Gekelman is a plasma physics professor at the University of California, Los Angeles (UCLA), and an elected fellow of the American Physical Society. He is known to have developed and constructed numerous meter-long devices to study fundamental plasma processes under laboratory conditions, the largest of which is the Large Plasma Device.

Early life 
Gekelman received a B.S. in physics from Brooklyn College in 1966 and a Ph.D. in experimental plasma physics at Stevens Institute of Technology in 1972.

Career 
Gekelman began working at UCLA in 1974. In 1991, he constructed the original 10 meter-long Large Plasma Device (LAPD) to study Alfvén waves in plasmas and was the director of the facility since then until he was succeeded by Troy Carter in 2016. During his tenure as director, the LAPD was upgraded in 2001 to its current 20 meter-long version and became a designated national user facility for the study of basic plasma science, garnering funding support from the National Science Foundation and the US Department of Energy. He was also a member of the National Research Council (NRC) Plasma Science Committee and the NRC Burning Plasma Assessment Committee.

Gekelman was also involved in scientific outreach for high school students. In 1993, he led the formation of the Los Angeles Teachers Alliance Group (LAPTAG) and created a plasma laboratory for high school students to do research. The laboratory is a device similar in construct to the LAPD, but smaller.

In 2002, Gekelman was interviewed by Robyn Williams on his science talk show.

Honors 
In 1996, Gekelman was elected as a fellow to the American Physical Society for"a unique, original program of complete and definitive diagnostic studies of magnetic field reconnection and current disruptions in plasmas, achieving major advances and linking space and laboratory plasma physics".

References 

Year of birth missing (living people)
Living people
American physicists
Fellows of the American Physical Society
Brooklyn College alumni
Stevens Institute of Technology alumni
American plasma physicists